Harrison George Himmelberg (born 8 May 1996) is a professional Australian rules footballer playing for the Greater Western Sydney Giants in the Australian Football League (AFL).

Early life
Himmelberg was born in Wagga Wagga, New South Wales and spent 1 year of his childhood living in New York City where his American father was working. 

Upon returning to Wagga, he participated in the Auskick program at Mangoplah Cookardinia United Eastlakes Football & Netball Club in Mangoplah and began playing his junior football at the club in the Riverina Football League.

Himmelberg moved to Canberra at 17 years of age to further his development with the GWS Giants developmental academy and the NSW/ACT Rams in the elite TAC Cup under-18 competition. He was drafted by Greater Western Sydney with their third selection and sixteenth overall in the 2015 national draft. 

He was educated at Wagga Wagga's Materi Dei Primary and Mater Dei Catholic College. 

His younger brother Elliott also plays professional football for the Adelaide Crows.

AFL career

References

External links

1996 births
Living people
Greater Western Sydney Giants players
Australian rules footballers from New South Wales
Eastlake Football Club players
Sportspeople from Wagga Wagga
Australian people of American descent